Konrad Frühwald (5 June 1890 – 19 April 1970) was a German politician of the Free Democratic Party (FDP) and former member of the German Bundestag.

Life 
Frühwald was a member of the Bavarian State Parliament from 1928 to 1933.

In 1947 he became a member of the Bavarian Senate and belonged to it until 1969. He was a member of the German Bundestag from 1949 to 1957, and from 1953 he was spokesman for agricultural policy for the FDP parliamentary group.

Literature

References

1890 births
1970 deaths
Members of the Bundestag for Bavaria
Members of the Bundestag 1953–1957
Members of the Bundestag 1949–1953
Members of the Bundestag for the Free Democratic Party (Germany)
Members of the Landtag of Bavaria